Seeing Red is the debut album by Canadian pop-punk band LiveonRelease, released by Her Royal Majesty's Records in October 2002.

Track listing
"Don't Leave Me Alone" – 2:31
"Hardcore" – 4:00
"Johnny Johnny" – 3:08
"Emotional Griptape" – 3:40
"Slow Down" – 2:53
"I'm Afraid of Britney Spears" – 3:05
"All Night Long" – 6:33
"Get with It" – 2:28
"Fake" – 4:22
"Why" – 3:01
"Dirt" – 3:00

External links
Review on Chartattack
Review on AllMusic

LiveonRelease albums
2002 debut albums